(English: Fram's basketball department) was the basketball department of Knattspyrnufélagið Fram, located in Reykjavík, Iceland.

Men's basketball

History
In 1973 Fram participated in the first edition of the Icelandic Second Division and became its first winner.

From the following season, the 1974–75 season, Fram Reykjavík began their leadership in the First Division and their series of wins which ended in the 1985–86 season when they won their fourth title.

Fram's best season came in 1981–1982 when the team won the Icelandic cup and finished second in the Úrvalsdeild. The basketball department disbanded after the 1986–87 season but had a brief revitalization in the 2010s, playing three seasons in the Second Division from 2010 to 2013 and making it to the playoffs in 2012 and 2013.

Honours, trophies and achievements
Icelandic Cup (1):
1982 
Icelandic Division I (4):
1974–75, 1978–79, 1980–81, 1985–86 
Icelandic Division II (1):
1973–74

Notable players

Women's basketball

History
Fram's women's basketball department was founded in March 1971. The club fielded a women's senior team in the Icelandic tournament for the first and only time during the 1976–77 season. The team folded after the annual Reykjavík Basketball Tournament in the fall of 1977.

Head coaches
 Davíð Janis

References

External links 
 fram.is: Official website of Fram Reykjavík
 fram-karfa.blogcentral.is: Official website of Fram Reykjavík basketball

 
Basketball teams in Iceland
Sport in Reykjavík
1908 establishments in Iceland